Kaylen Bassett (born 17 July 1997) is an Australian male canoeist who was a finalist at the senior level at the 2018 and 2019 Wildwater Canoeing World Championships.

References

External links

 
 

1997 births
Living people
Australian male canoeists
Place of birth missing (living people)
21st-century Australian people